NGC 5985 is a spiral galaxy located in the northern constellation Draco. NGC 5985 was discovered by William Herschel in 1788.

Gallery

References

External links

Intermediate spiral galaxies
5985
Draco (constellation)